Woman's Christian Temperance Union Fountain is a historic temperance fountain located at Rehoboth Beach, Sussex County, Delaware. It was erected by the Woman's Christian Temperance Union in 1929 to commemorate the 50th anniversary of the Delaware branch of the organization.  It measures six feet tall, three feet wide, and is constructed of granite.

It was added to the National Register of Historic Places in 1977.

See also
Drinking fountains in the United States

References

Drinking fountains in the United States
National Register of Historic Places in Delaware
Rehoboth Beach, Delaware
Buildings and structures in Sussex County, Delaware
Woman's Christian Temperance Union
Buildings and structures completed in 1929
History of women in Delaware